Parasabatinca is an extinct genus of small primitive metallic moths within the extant family Micropterigidae or extinct family Eolepidopterigidae, containing two species. The first is Parasabatinca aftimacrai, of which fossil remains have been found in Lebanese amber and have been dated to the Lower Cretaceous.

Description 
These fossil moths have similarly shaped wings and wing scales, with abundant microtrichia on the wing membrane, comparable with recent Micropterigidae species such as Sabatinca and Micropteryx, but differences from them by the lack of ocelli and the apparent absence of a branch of the subcostal vein. The species is close to Sabatinca with which it has more characters in common than with Micropterix.

Parasabatinca caldasae is known from two specimens from the Crato Formation in Brazil. The age of the fossil has been estimated to be between 125 and 112 Ma, since it was discovered in Crato fossil beds (Lower Cretaceous, Aptian).

References 

†
†
Fossil Lepidoptera
Cretaceous insects
Prehistoric insects of Asia
Fossils of Lebanon
Early Cretaceous animals of South America
Cretaceous Brazil
Fossils of Brazil
Crato Formation
Fossil taxa described in 1978